The 2nd Regiment California Volunteer Cavalry was a cavalry regiment in the Union Army during the American Civil War. It spent its entire term of service in the western United States, with most of its companies dispersed to various posts.

History
2nd Regiment California Volunteer Cavalry was organized under the President's second call upon the State for troops in August 1861.  By October 30, 1861, the regiment was organized and mustered into the service.  The companies were assembled at Camp Alert in San Francisco.  After completing the organization of the regiment, and a short period for drill and discipline, the regiment was sent, by companies, to various posts within the Department of the Pacific.  The final muster out of the regiment was in March, 1866.

2nd Regiment California Volunteer Cavalry Commanders
 Colonel Andrew J. Smith October 2, 1861 - resigned November 15, 1861
 Colonel Columbus Sims November 13, 1861 - January 31, 1863
 Colonel George S. Evans February 1, 1863 - resigned May 31, 1863
 Colonel Edward McGarry November 29, 1864 - March 31, 1866.

Company assignments
 Headquarters: After completing the organization of the regiment, and a short period for drill and discipline, the Regimental headquarters was sent to Utah Territory, remaining there until October, 1864, when it moved to Camp Union, near Sacramento, and remained there until the final muster out of the regiment as an organization, in March, 1866.
 Company A:  Company A went first to Fort Churchill, Nevada, then to Utah Territory, where it remained until December, 1864, when it took station at Camp Union near Sacramento.  About that time the terms of service of most of its members expired.
 New Company A:  Company A was reorganized by reenlistment of many of its old members and the enlistment of recruits enough to fill up the company to the required number.  In September, 1865, it marched to Fort Miller, in Fresno County, and in November 1865, it marched to Camp Babbitt, near Visalia, where it remained until ordered to Camp Union, near Sacramento, for muster out, in April, 1866.
 Company B: Company B was ordered to Southern California in February 1862, and became part of Carleton's California Column.  It marched with that command to New Mexico.  In the spring of 1864 it returned to California, and was mustered out as a company at San Francisco, October 10, 1864. The company commander during this period of service was Captain John C. Cremony.
 New Company B: After the muster out of the original Company B, a new Company B was organized, and George D. Conrad became Captain of the company. The new company remained at Camp Union, until June, 1865, when it moved to the mining town of Dun Glen, Nevada, where it served defending against Indian attacks, until mustered out in the spring of 1866.
 Company C: Served at Fort Crook, nearly the whole of the time it was in the service.
 New Company C: When the enlistments of its original members expired in the fall of 1864, they were mustered out at Fort Crook, and the company was filled up by enlistment of recruits in San Francisco. It was finally mustered out at Sacramento in May, 1866.
 Company D:  After leaving Camp Alert, Company D went to Southern California in early 1862, the company was camped at Kline's Ranch while the rest were on detached duty supporting the organization of the California Column.  In June 1862, it was sent to join Col. Evans' campaign against the Paiute in the Owens Valley but then returned to Camp Babbit in the fall.  On the rusumtion of hostilities in the Owens Valley they marched back in April 1863 via Keyesville, engaged in the Keyesville Massacre then moved on to Camp Independence, in the Owens River Valley, participating in the final campaign of the Owens Valley Indian War, and escorting almost 1000 Paiute to Fort Tejon in July 1863.  They remained there until August, 1863; then to Fort Tejon, until March, 1864, when it moved to Camp Union, where the original members were mustered out.
 New Company D:   Upon the expiration of their enlistment terms, during the months of September and October, 1864 the company was reorganized by Captain W. L. Knight, and after serving a short time at Camp Union, and Camp Jackson, in Amador County, it went to Colusa; then to Red Bluff, and finally, in July, 1865, to Smoke Creek, Nevada (north of Pyramid Lake), where it remained until ordered in to be mustered out at Camp Union, May 29, 1866.
 Company E:  Originally organized as the "Tuolumne Rangers", after leaving Camp Alert, Company E, went first to Fort Humboldt, remaining there until the spring of 1862.  No record of the stations of this company can be found from February, 1862, until April, 1863, at which time it was at Camp Babbit then marched to Camp Independence, Owens River Valley.  During July, 1863, it went to Fort Tejon, and in August, 1863, to Camp Babbitt, near Visalia, where it remained until November, 1865.
 New Company E:  The original members were mustered out in San Francisco, October 6, 1864. After leaving Camp Babbitt the company was stationed again at Camp Independence, until it was ordered to San Francisco to be mustered out, which took place June 2, 1866.
 Company F:  This company was organized in Sacramento, and was first called the "Sacramento Rangers."  After leaving Camp Alert it was stationed at various places, Camp Union and on July 31, 1863 Camp Bidwell until April 1864 when it returned to Camp Union.  About one third of the company, under a Lieutenant, was kept in San Francisco as a provost guard most of the time that the company was in the service.  This company furnished a large number of officers for other companies and regiments of the California Volunteers, fourteen of its enlisted men were commissioned as officers.
 New Company F:  The terms of service of the original members expired and they were mustered out at San Francisco, September 24, 1864.  The company was again filled up with new recruits, and it was stationed at Camp Union and various other places, Bear Valley, Mariposa County, California, Ione Valley, Colusa, Fort Crook, Smoke Creek, Nevada, Fort Bidwell and Goose Lake, California. It was finally mustered out at Sacramento, June 27, 1866.
 Company G:  Company G, after its organization at Camp Alert, was sent to Camp Drum, where it remained about a month; then went to Camp Latham, near Los Angeles. There is no record showing how long it remained at Camp Latham, nor of the time between February 28, 1862, when it was at the latter place, and April 30, 1863, when it was stationed at Camp Independence, in the Owens Valley.  During August, 1863, the company moved to Camp Leonard, California, where it remained for two months.  It then went to Fort Tejon, remaining three months; then to Camp Babbitt, near Visalia, where it remained from January, 1864, to August, 1864 when it marched to San Francisco to be mustered out.  The original members were mustered out during the months of September and October, 1864.
 New Company E:  The company was again filled up, and was stationed at Camp Union from October, 1864, to March, 1865.  It was in Camp near Hornitos, Mariposa County, for one month; then at Camp Union until February 1, 1866, when it was finally mustered out.
 Company H:  Company H, after organization at Camp Alert, was sent to Fort Churchill, Nevada, where it was stationed during the months of January and February, 1862. There are no records of the stations of this company from February 28, 1862, until April 30, 1864, when it was stationed at Camp Relief, Utah Territory, and from May to August, 1864, at Camp Conness, Idaho Territory, and at Camp Douglas, Utah Territory, during September, 1864.  The terms of service of most of the original members expired during the months of September and October, and they were mustered out at Camp Douglas.
 New Company H:  The remaining men were marched to Camp Union, Sacramento, where the company was recruited up to strength, and remained on duty there from December, 1864 to March, 1865.  It was on provost guard duty in the City of Sacramento from April to August, when it was ordered to Drum Barracks, Los Angeles County, arriving there about October 1, 1865, where it remained until its final muster out, April 20, 1866.  A detachment, stationed in San Francisco, was mustered out at the Presidio, April 26, 1866.
 Company I: Company I was organized at Camp Alert. It was sent first to Camp Drum, where it was stationed during January, 1862, and at Camp Latham, near Los Angeles, in February, 1862.  From February, 1862 to April, 1863, there is no record.  On April 30, 1863, the company was at Camp Babbitt, near Visalia, where it remained until January, 1864.  It then marched to Benicia Barracks, where it was stationed from March to May.  It moved in June, 1864, to Camp Bidwell, near Chico, California, where it remained.  The terms of most of the original members expired in September, 1864 and they were discharged in San Francisco from October 1 to October 7, 1864.
 New Company I:  Recruited up to strength at Camp Bidwell, the company remained there until May 1865.  During June and July it was en route to Fort McDermitt, Nevada, where it remained until it was ordered in for final muster out at Sacramento, June 24, 1866.
 Company K: Company K was at Camp Alert until February 28, 1862. There is no report showing when the company left that post nor where it served for more than a year.  It appears at Fort Ruby, Nevada, March 31, 1863, and it was then stationed at Deep Creek, Utah, Government Springs, Utah, Cedar Swamp, Utah, Fort Ruby again, Farmington, Utah, and at Camp Douglas, Utah, about a month at each place.  It was stationed at Camp Douglas from November, 1863, until April, 1864.  It then moved to various places: Camp Relief, Utah, Canon Creek, Idaho, Camp Conness, Idaho, Farmington, Utah, and Camp Douglas again, arriving at the latter place about the last of September, 1864, where nearly all of the original members were mustered out for expiration of terms.
 New Company K: The company was again recruited up to strength and served at Camp Union, to June 30, 1865, then at Chico, California, July, 1865, Smoke Creek, Nevada, from August to October, 1865.  Then at Fort Churchill until May 1, 1866, when it was marched to Camp Union, and finally mustered out May 18, 1866.
 Company L: Company L was at Camp Alert until March, 1862, from which time until April 30, 1863, no record can be found of the localities occupied by the company. During that month it was in camp at Bishop Creek, Owens River Valley; during May, 1863, at Camp Independence, same valley; June, at Fort Churchill, July, at Fort Ruby, both in Nevada; August, en route to Salt Lake, and from that month to March, 1864, at Camp Douglas, near Salt Lake City. During the next four months it was at various places in succession, as follows: Rush Valley, March, 1864; Camp Relief, April; Camp Conness, May; Bingham Creek, June; and back to Camp Douglas for the next two months; The terms of service of the original members expired in September and October, 1864, and they were mustered out at Camp Douglas.
 New Company L: The company was reorganized and recruited up to strength at Camp Douglas, then sent to Fort Bridger, Wyoming Territory, for five months.  Then they went to Fort Laramie, for a few months; then in Rush Valley, Utah, to May, 1866, and finally back to Camp Douglas for final muster out on July 12, 1866.
 Company M:  Company M was at Camp Alert until the spring of 1862, from which time until May, 1863, no record of its stations can be found. From May 1, 1863, to May, 1864, it was stationed at Fort Bridger, Wyoming Territory.  From May until August, 1864, it was surveying and making a wagon road from Salt Lake to the head of navigation on the Colorado River, in Arizona Territory, near Fort Mojave.  From August to November, it was at Camp Douglas.  The terms of service of the original members expired in September and October, 1864, and the company was mustered out at Camp Douglas, October 4, 1864.
 New Company M:  The company was immediately reorganized by recruiting new members, and from November, 1864, to May, 1865, it was at Fort Bridger, Wyoming Territory.  From May to June, 1865, at Fort Laramie; July to November, 1864 at various places in Dakota, Wyoming, and Utah Territories.  From November, 1865, to May, 1866, they were at Government Reservation, Rush Valley, Utah.  From May to June, 1866, at Camp Douglas, where the company was finally mustered out, July 12, 1866.

See also
List of California Civil War Union units

References

Sources 
 The California State Military Museum; 2nd Regiment of Cavalry, California Volunteers
  Records of California men in the war of the rebellion 1861 to 1867 By California. Adjutant General's Office, SACRAMENTO: State Office, J. D. Young, Supt. State Printing. 1890. pp.168-303

Units and formations of the Union Army from California
Military units and formations of the United States in the Indian Wars
Military units and formations established in 1861
1861 establishments in California
Military units and formations disestablished in 1866